Club Deportivo Logroñés "B", S.A.D. was a Spanish football team based in Logroño, in the autonomous community of La Rioja. Founded in 1950, it was the reserve team of CD Logroñés, and was dissolved in 2000.

History

Club background
Club Deportivo Recreación de Logroño (1950–1968)
Club Deportivo Logroñés Promesas (1968–1991)
Club Deportivo Logroñés "B" (1968–1991)

Season to season

6 seasons in Segunda División B
15 seasons in Tercera División

References

External links
Official website 
Unofficial fansite 
ArefePedia profile 

B-team
Sport in Logroño
Defunct football clubs in La Rioja (Spain)
Association football clubs established in 1950
1950 establishments in Spain
Association football clubs disestablished in 2000
2000 disestablishments in Spain